Brandon Miller (born June 27, 2003) is an American middle-distance runner who specializes in the 800 metres. He qualified for the 800 m at the 2022 World Athletics Championships after finishing third at the 2022 USA Outdoor Track and Field Championships.

References

External links
 

2003 births
Living people
American male middle-distance runners
Texas A&M Aggies men's track and field athletes
Sportspeople from St. Louis